Sheng Aiyi (1900–1983), was the first Chinese women entrepreneur in the entertainment industry, the general manager of Shanghai BaiLeMen company. She was also a member of the school board of the Shanghai Jiao Tong University (the original Nan Yang College of Chiao Tung). She was the seventh daughter of Sheng Xuanhuai, Shanghai's biggest capitalist at that time.

Biography
Sheng Aiyi was so smart and glib when she was still a little girl that she became the most favorite daughter of Sheng Xuanhuai. Sheng Aiyi was admitted to Shanghai St. John's university, and she had a good knowledge of English. She also had many other talents, such as drawing Chinese pictures, embroidering and hand writing. Her father died she was 16 years old, and at that time she had already become a graceful lady. If there were any private things, her mother, Mrs. Sheng, would like to share with her. Though less than 20 years old, she was so well informed that she became famous in Shanghai.

Relationships
As a talented woman of an era, Sheng Aiyi was pursued by many men, the most famous one was the affair with T. V. Soong, the brother of Soong Mei-ling. However, at that time T. V. Soong was just a poor boy back abroad and then became the personal secretary of Sheng Enyi (Sheng Aiyi's brother). T. V. Soong and Sheng Aiyi then fell in love with each other but it was strongly rejected by Mrs. Sheng because of Song's inferior household. So later T. V. Soong went to Guangzhou to seek his fortune and Sheng Aiyi promised him not to marry to other man before his return. He then served as governor of the Central Bank of China and minister of finance In the Kuomintang-controlled government and married to Lo-Yi Chang (張樂怡 Zhang Leyi), ignoring the fact that Sheng Aiyi was still waiting for him.

Events
In September 1927, Mrs. Zhuang died of an illness, and Sheng Aiyi's three brothers, namely Sheng Enyi, Sheng Shengyi and Sheng Zhongyi, declared all the property to themselves, excluding her from the inheritance. Much to their surprise, Sheng Aiyi was a modern woman and she took his three brothers and two nephews to court in June 1928, making her the first woman in China's history to practise the law to protect women's rights. With the support of Soong Ching-ling and Soong Ai-ling, Sheng Aiyi won the case and got her rightful share of the property. The lawsuit had important significance for setting a precedent for women's right to inheritance.
In 1932, with the money Sheng Aiyi won from the case, she built the six-floor Paramount ballroom in American style. It was said that the mayor of Shanghai of the national government also attended the opening ceremony. It became one of the most famous luxurious entertainment club in Shanghai. Many KMT officials joined the club, and even Soong Mei-ling often had reception banquets there.

References

External links
 (ORIENTAL FEMALE)
 (Transcentury Reading)

1900 births
1983 deaths
Businesspeople from Shanghai
St. John's University, Shanghai alumni
20th-century Chinese businesswomen
20th-century Chinese businesspeople